Desi Druschel (born 1976) is an American professional baseball coach for the New York Yankees of Major League Baseball.

Career
Druschel graduated from Vinton-Shellsburg High School in Vinton, Iowa. He attended Upper Iowa University and Mount Mercy University, playing baseball and basketball. He graduated from Mount Mercy in 1998 with a bachelor's degree in management. He enrolled at Indiana University Bloomington and a master's degree in athletic administration in 2001.

Druschel began his coaching career as an assistant at Vinton-Shellsburg in 1996, and continued there through 2000. He was also an assistant coach for Indiana University from 1999 to 2000 and Mount St. Clare College from 2000 to 2001. He was the head coach for The Franciscan University from 2001 to 2004. He coached for Mount Mercy University for nine years, before he was hired as director of operations for the University of Iowa's baseball program in 2014. In 2017, he served as the pitching coach for the Iowa Hawkeyes.

The Yankees hired Druschel in 2019. They promoted him to their major league staff as a pitching coach after the 2021 season.

Personal life
Druschel and his wife, Jessica, have two children.

References

Living people
Mount Mercy Mustangs baseball coaches
Iowa Hawkeyes baseball coaches
People from Vinton, Iowa
Indiana University Bloomington alumni
New York Yankees coaches
Upper Iowa Peacocks baseball players
Year of birth missing (living people)